The Príncipe thrush (Turdus xanthorhynchus) is a species of bird in the family Turdidae. It is endemic to Príncipe. It was formerly considered a subspecies of the São Tomé thrush, with some taxonomists still considering it so.

Its natural habitats are subtropical or tropical moist lowland forests and subtropical or tropical moist montane forests. It is critically threatened by habitat loss.

References

Turdus
Endemic birds of São Tomé and Príncipe
Critically endangered fauna of Africa
Birds described in 1901